George Kestell-Cornish was the third Anglican Bishop of Madagascar from 1919 until his death in 1925. His father, Kestell Kestell-Cornish, having been the first  Bishop of Madagascar from 1874 to 1896.

He was born on 4 September 1856 and educated at Keble College, Oxford  and ordained in 1880. He began his career with a curacy at  St James’, Great Grimsby. He then followed his father to Madagascar and was Principal of two schools before being appointed Archdeacon then Bishop of the country. He was consecrated in St Paul's Cathedral on 18th of October 1919. 

He died on 23 June 1925.

Notes

External links 
 Cathédrale Saint Laurent Ambohimanoro

1856 births
Alumni of Keble College, Oxford
Anglican archdeacons in Africa
20th-century Anglican bishops in Africa
Anglican bishops of Madagascar
1925 deaths